Cîrnățenii Noi is a commune in Căușeni District, Moldova. It is between Căinari and Sălcuța Nouă.

References

Communes of Căușeni District